Stitswerd is a village in the municipality of Het Hogeland, Groningen, the Netherlands. It had a population of around 45 in January 2017. Stitswerd is located on a wierde near the estuary of the former river Fivel.

Stitswerd has the highest postal code in the Netherlands (9999 XL).

History
The village was first mentioned in the second half of the 9th century as Stukisweret, and means "terp (artificial living hill) of Stukki (person)".

The Dutch Reformed church dates from the 13th century and is located on the terp, however part of the terp has been excavated. The church is sometimes in service, but is also used for cultural activities.

Stitswert was home to 209 people 1840. It was part of Kantens municipality before 1990, when it became part of Hefshuizen. In 2019, it became part of the municipality of Het Hogeland.

Gallery

References

External links 
 

Het Hogeland
Populated places in Groningen (province)